Strawberry Cake is a live album and 53rd overall album by American singer Johnny Cash, released on Columbia Records in 1976.  The album includes numerous pieces of between-song stage banter.  The album includes several of Cash's most well-known early songs, such as "Big River", "I Still Miss Someone" and "Rock Island Line", as well as a number of more obscure compositions, some of which were performed by Cash for the first time; this includes "Strawberry Cake" and "Navajo". The title track was released as a single, but did poorly on the charts, peaking at No. 54.

The concert was held and recorded at the London Palladium on September 21, 1975. An IRA bomb threat warning was given as June Carter Cash started to sing "The Church in the Wildwood" meant the theatre had to be evacuated but the show continued after the building was searched. The bomb threat announcement and the subsequent evacuation order is included on the recording and is, in fact, a "hidden" track and is not listed on the record sleeve or CD cover. Later, prior to the performance of "Destination Victoria Station," June Carter Cash is heard joking that the threat might have been made because she was about to sing.

Track 7 is mislabelled on the sleeve as "Dialogue" but is, in fact, a comedic a capella duet performance by Cash and June Carter Cash of "Another Man Done Gone", a song Cash had recorded for Blood, Sweat and Tears. Prior to performing "Rock Island Line", a song Cash recorded for Sun Records, singer Lonnie Donegan, who had a major US hit with the song, is introduced in the audience.

Track listing

Personnel 
Johnny Cash - vocals, acoustic guitar
June Carter Cash - vocals, acoustic guitar
The Carter Family - vocals
Marshall Grant - bass
W.S. Holland - drums
Bob Wootton - electric guitar
Jerry Hensley - electric guitar
Larry McCoy - piano
Additional personnel
Charlie Bragg - producer, engineer
Mixed at House of Cash Recording Studios, Hendersonville, Tennessee
Bill Barnes - album design 
Chance Martin - cover photography
Hope Powell - flyleaf photography
Johnny Cash, Charlie Bragg - liner notes

Charts
Album – Billboard (United States)

Singles – Billboard (United States)

References

1976 live albums
Johnny Cash live albums
Columbia Records live albums
Albums recorded at the London Palladium